James Joicey, 1st Baron Joicey JP DL (4 April 1846 – 21 November 1936) was an English industrialist, politician, and aristocrat known primarily for being a coal mining magnate from Durham and a Liberal Party Member of Parliament (MP).

Life
James Joicey was born on 4 April 1846 in Tanfield, co. Durham, the second son of George Joicey, partner in an engineering firm in Newcastle, and Dorothy Joicey née Gowland. The family was living in Kip Hill at the time of Joicey's baptism in June 1846. He attended the Anchorage School, Gateshead, and Gainford Academy, near Darlington. Joicey's father died when Joicey was ten years old.

Joicey married Amy Robinson in 1879. They had two sons. Widowed in 1881, Joicey married Marguerite Smyles Drever in 1884 and they had two sons and a daughter.

Career 

Aged seventeen years old, Joicey began as a clerk at his uncle James' mining company James Joicey & Co., Ltd, (founded in 1838, incorporated in 1886) which operated several collieries in the West Durham coalfield including pits at Beamish and Tanfield. Joicey became managing director in 1872. He purchased Lord Durham's Lambton collieries in 1896 and the Hetton collieries in 1911. He was Chairman and Managing Director of both James Joicey & Co., Ltd, and the Lambton & Hetton Collieries, Ltd. From late 1924, steps were taken to merge both companies to form the Lambton, Hetton & Joicey Collieries. Popularly known on Tyneside as "Jimmy Joicey" and "Old King Coal", Joicey was reputed to have been the largest coal-owner in the world.

Baron Joicey worked in government held posts in England, working as Deputy Lieutenant for County Durham, and Justice of the Peace for Northumberland, Montgomeryshire and Newcastle Upon-Tyne.
Joicey was elected as Member of Parliament for Chester-le-Street at the 1885 general election, and held the seat until the 1906 election. He was created a Baronet of Longhirst and of Ulgham, both in the County of Northumberland, on 3 July 1893 and then elevated to the peerage as Baron Joicey, of Chester-le-Street in the County of Durham, on 13 January 1906.

From 1887 his seat was Longhirst Hall near Morpeth, Northumberland. In 1906 he bought the Ford Castle estate, Ford, Northumberland, and in 1908 the Etal Castle estate in Northumberland.

Death 
Joicey died at his home, Ford Castle, on 21 November 1936, aged 90, and was buried at St Michael's Church, Ford. He was succeeded by his son James Arthur.

References

External links 
 
 
 St Michael's Church, Ford, gravesite

1846 births
1936 deaths
British mining businesspeople
Liberal Party (UK) MPs for English constituencies
Barons in the Peerage of the United Kingdom
UK MPs 1885–1886
UK MPs 1886–1892
UK MPs 1892–1895
UK MPs 1895–1900
UK MPs 1900–1906
UK MPs who were granted peerages
People from Tanfield, County Durham
People from Ford, Northumberland
Peers created by Edward VII